Fae Myenne Ng (born December 2, 1956 in San Francisco) is an American novelist, and short story writer.

She is a first-generation Chinese American author whose debut novel Bone told the story of three Chinese American daughters growing up in her real childhood hometown of San Francisco Chinatown. Her work has received support from the American Academy of Arts & Letters' Rome Prize, the Lila Wallace Reader's Digest Writers' Award, the National Endowment for the Arts, the Lannan Foundation, and The Radcliffe Institute. She has held residencies at Yaddo, McDowell, and the Djerassi Foundation.

Life
She is the daughter of seamstress and a laborer, who immigrated from Guangzhou, China. She attended the University of California-Berkeley, and received her M.F.A. at Columbia University. Ng has supported herself by working as a waitress and at other temporary jobs. She teaches UC Berkeley AAADS 20C.

Her short stories have appeared in The American Voice, Calyx, City Lights Review, Crescent Review, and Harper's. She currently teaches at UC Berkeley and UCLA in the English and Asian American Studies departments.

Awards
 nominated and finalist for the PEN/Faulkner Award, for Bone
 grant by the National Endowment for the Arts.
 2008 American Book Award for Steer Toward Rock
 2009 Guggenheim Fellowship

Works
 Bone, Hyperion, 1993

Anthologies

References

Sources
 University of Minnesota biography and review
 "Author Interviews: Fae Myenne Ng", August 14, 2008

External links
Author Interview regarding Bone
 http://faemyenneng.com/

1956 births
Living people
20th-century American novelists
21st-century American novelists
American women novelists
American women writers of Chinese descent
Columbia University School of the Arts alumni
University of California, Berkeley alumni
American novelists of Chinese descent
American short story writers of Chinese descent
American women short story writers
20th-century American women writers
21st-century American women writers
20th-century short story writers
21st-century American short story writers
PEN/Faulkner Award for Fiction winners
American Book Award winners